Ma Haide (September 26, 1910 – October 3, 1988), born Shafick George Hatem, was an American doctor who practiced medicine in China.

Family and early life 
Shafick George Hatem was born into a Lebanese-American family in upstate New York. His father Nahoum Salaama Hatem moved to the United States from the village of Hammana in the Metn mountains of Lebanon in 1902, to take a job at a textile mill in Lawrence, Massachusetts. In 1909, on a trip to Lebanon, Nahoum married Thamam Joseph, a woman two years younger from the village of Bahannes.

George Hatem's parents were of Maronite background. Some older
sources claim that the family was of Syrian Jewish extraction, but according to modern biographers, that was a misconception, although quite common even during George Hatem's life.

Soon after being married, the Hatem family moved to Buffalo, New York, where Nahoum took a job at a steel mill. It was in Buffalo where their first child, George, was born on September 26, 1910.

In 1923 Hatem's father sent him to live in Greenville, North Carolina, and the rest of the family joined him a few years later and opened a dry goods store.   He graduated as valedictorian of the 1927 class of Greenville High School Hatem focused on pre-med classes at the University of North Carolina, where he was a member of The Dialectic and Philanthropic Societies. He then studied medicine at the American University in Beirut and the University of Geneva.

While in Geneva, "Shag", as he was then nicknamed, became acquainted with students from East Asia, and learned much about China.  With financial help from the parents of one of his friends, he and several others set off to Shanghai to establish a medical practice to concentrate on venereal diseases, as well as basic health care for the needy.

Career

Shanghai 
On August 3, 1933, Hatem with colleagues, Lazar Katz and Robert Levinson, boarded a ship in Trieste that took him to several ports in Asia, including Singapore and Hong Kong. On September 5, the three young American doctors landed in Shanghai.

Hatem set up the practice in Shanghai, and changed his name to Ma Hai-te (Ma Haide). As he came to know Shanghai and its inequalities, he also came to know three people who shaped the ideas he used to interpret what he saw: the well known journalist, Agnes Smedley, the New Zealand activist Rewi Alley, and the presiding figure among left-wing sympathizers, Soong Ching-ling, the widow of Sun Yat-sen. Rewi Alley was to be his friend and mentor for the next five decades, Mme. Soong was to provide key introductions, and Smedley, who heard of Hatem by reading one of his pamphlets on public health, introduced him to Liu Ding. Liu, a liaison for the Chinese Communists, was described as a "young Red engineer" who awakened Hatem's heart.

By 1936, disgusted by the corruption of Shanghai and alarmed by the world drift towards fascism, he decided that he would either go to Spain to support the Republican government or join the communist movement in Northeast China. He closed his practice and, with the help of the earlier established Communist contacts, was smuggled across Kuomintang lines to provide medical service to Mao Zedong's Communist troops.

Yan'an 
In the summer of 1936, Ma travelled to the Communist headquarters at Bao'an (present-day Zhidan), temporary capital of the Communist-controlled Shaanxi-Gansu-Ningxia Border Region.  He was accompanied by the pioneering American journalist Edgar Snow.  At Hatem's request, he was not explicitly mentioned in the first edition of Snow's famous book, Red Star Over China.  He is there anonymously as a Western-trained doctor who had examined Mao and determined he was not dying of some mysterious disease, which was the rumour at the time.

As the war with Japan started in earnest in 1937, Ma Haide sent requests to Soong Ching-ling, Agnes Smedley, and other notables to organize recruitment of foreign medical personnel for the communists' troops fighting the Japanese armies in northern China. He was among those meeting Norman Bethune when Bethune arrived to Yan'an in late March 1938, and was instrumental in helping Bethune get started at his task of organizing medical services for the front and the region.

He was present at Yan'an, when the Dixie Mission, an American civilian and military group, arrived in July 1944.  Ma was a source of surprise and comfort for many of the Americans when they met the American born physician.  Many accounts of the mission make reference to Haide.  Known commonly to the group as "Doc Ma," Ma periodically assisted Major Melvin Casberg in studies of the state of medical treatment in the Communist territories.

Post-war life 
Ma remained a doctor with the Communists until their victory in 1949, afterwards becoming a public health official. He was the first foreigner granted citizenship in the People's Republic of China. He is credited with helping to eliminate leprosy and many venereal diseases in post-war China, for which he received the Lasker Medical Award in 1986. He was one of the few persons who were not born in China to hold a position of trust and authority in the People's Republic of China. His Chinese name can be loosely translated to mean "Horse" (last name, commonly used by Chinese Muslims) and "Virtue From the Sea" (first name).

In the 1950s, Ma was secretly granted Chinese citizenship, but he retained his American passport until the 1960s. Despite his reputation as the most loved American in China, he was denounced during the Cultural Revolution as a "bourgeois lackey."

There is an extensive interview with him in the Canadian Broadcasting Corporation's groundbreaking 90 min documentary by Patrick Watson, The Seven Hundred Million (1964).

Honors and awards 
During his lifetime, he was honored in his father's hometown of Hammana in Lebanon, where the main square of the city is named after him.

In 1986, Ma received the Albert Lasker Public Service Award for his legendary contributions to the control and eradication of venereal diseases and leprosy in China.

Personal life 

Ma's wife was Chou Sufei (aka Zhou Sufei 周苏菲), an actress. They had a son Chou Youma (aka Zhou Youma 周幼马) (b. 1943) and a daughter Liang Bi.

On October 3, 1988, Ma died in Beijing at the age of 78. He is buried at the Babaoshan Revolutionary Cemetery in Beijing, China.

References

Sources
 . Partial text on Google Books.
 Snow, Edgar. The Other Side of the River: Red China Today. New York: Random House, 1962.

External links 

 Journal of Public Health Policy review of books about Ma Haide, 2001
 Open Mind interview
 Ma Haide, the Saga of American Doctor George Hatem in China
 Behind Red Star over China (2006 account from China Daily)
 
 Maine University. 2008. Photo of tomb of Ma Haide (George Hatem) at Babaoshan Revolutionary Cemetery in Beijing, China. Photo taken by Marilyn Shea. 

1910 births
1988 deaths
Eighth Route Army surgeons
Chinese military doctors
Chinese public health doctors
American people of Lebanese descent
American emigrants to China
Chinese people of Lebanese descent
People of the Chinese Civil War
People of the Second Sino-Japanese War
Physicians from Buffalo, New York
Naturalized citizens of the People's Republic of China
People from Greenville, North Carolina
20th-century Chinese physicians
Burials at Babaoshan Revolutionary Cemetery